Aura Airlines SL (previously Gowair Vacation Airlines) was a Spanish airline based at Adolfo Suárez Madrid–Barajas Airport.

History
Previosly owned by tour operator Gowaii, it operated charter flights in Europe and offerd ACMI leases to other airlines. The company received its first aircraft, an Airbus A320-200, in July 2017. It planned to start flights to the Caribbean using an Airbus A330 in 2018, however by 2020 the company had not begun operation of any aircraft.

Aura Airlines ceased operations on October 27, 2022.

Fleet

By January 2022, Aura Airlines operated the following aircraft:

See also
List of airlines of Spain

References

Airlines of Spain
Airlines established in 2017
Airlines disestablished in 2022